Ariel Rene McDonald (born January 5, 1972) is an American-Slovenian retired professional basketball player. He played at the point guard position. A high quality floor general who was the 2000 Israeli Basketball Premier League MVP, FIBA SuproLeague Final Four MVP in 2001, and an All-EuroLeague Second Team member in 2002, McDonald played for top European teams like Montepaschi Siena, Olimpija Ljubljana, Maccabi Tel Aviv, Panathinaikos, Akasvayu Girona, and Dynamo Moscow.

Early life and career
McDonald began his high school career at Homewood-Flossmoor High School, outside of Chicago. He averaged 24 points per game, on 63% field-goal shooting, and 10 assists per game. After two years at Homewood-Flossmoor, McDonald's family moved to Raleigh, North Carolina. McDonald took his new high school, Athens Drive High School, to the final four in North Carolina.

College career
In the fall of 1989, McDonald arrived at the University of Minnesota. In his first year of college basketball, McDonald was red-shirted. He and the Golden Gophers greatly improved over the next four years, winning the NIT Tournament, and reaching the second round of the 1994 NCAA Tournament, in McDonald's senior year.

Professional career
McDonald began his pro career in Europe, playing with small teams like Castors Braine (Belgium) and Interier Krško (Slovenia). After his time in Interier Krsko, he was signed by the top Slovenian basketball club: Olimpija Ljubljana. During his time in Slovenia, he played in the EuroLeague, which is the top-tier level of European-wide professional club basketball, and he played in the 1997 EuroLeague Final Four.

McDonald's next stop was Maccabi Tel Aviv. Soon McDonald became very famous in Israel, and together with Nate Huffman and Anthony Parker, turned Maccabi into one of the best European basketball teams. In McDonald's three seasons with Maccabi, the club won the FIBA SuproLeague title (2001) and twice reached the EuroLeague Final Four (2000, 2002). He was the 2000 Israeli Basketball Premier League MVP

McDonald played in 139 games, scoring 1,606 points for Maccabi Tel Aviv in three years. Finally, he said goodbye to the club, and moved to one of Maccabi's biggest rivals: Panathinaikos. With Panathinaikos, McDonald put up solid numbers, and also 19 points in the first game he played against his former team, Maccabi Tel Aviv. McDonald played for Akasvayu Girona in the Spanish ACB League, from the 2005–06 season, up until July 2008. Then he returned to Dynamo Moscow, for which he had previously played with, in the 2004–05 season.

National team career
McDonald was also a member of the senior men's Slovenian national basketball team. He played with Slovenia's senior national team at the FIBA EuroBasket 2001.

Coaching career
After he retired from playing professional basketball, McDonald became a high school basketball coach at Providence Academy, in Plymouth, Minnesota.

Personal life
After playing for two years in Slovenia, McDonald became a Slovenian citizen in June 1997. One of McDonald's claims to fame in Israel, was a Burger King commercial, in which he said: "Listen to McDonald - only Burger King".

References

External links

Euroleague.net Profile
FIBA Profile
FIBA Europe Profile
Eurobasket.com Profile
Spanish League Profile 
Italian League Profile 
McDonald's vs. McDonald

1972 births
Living people
African-American basketball players
American expatriate basketball people in Belgium
American expatriate basketball people in Greece
American expatriate basketball people in Israel
American expatriate basketball people in Italy
American expatriate basketball people in Russia
American expatriate basketball people in Slovenia
American expatriate basketball people in Spain
American men's basketball players
Athens Drive High School alumni
Basketball players from Illinois
BC Dynamo Moscow players
CB Girona players
Greek Basket League players
Israeli Basketball Premier League players
KK Olimpija players
Liga ACB players
Maccabi Tel Aviv B.C. players
Mens Sana Basket players
Minnesota Golden Gophers men's basketball players
Panathinaikos B.C. players
People from Harvey, Illinois
Point guards
Slovenian men's basketball players
Slovenian people of African-American descent
Sportspeople from Cook County, Illinois
Homewood-Flossmoor High School alumni
21st-century African-American sportspeople
20th-century African-American sportspeople